Łosewo may refer to the following places:
Łosewo, Masovian Voivodeship (east-central Poland)
Łosewo, Grajewo County in Podlaskie Voivodeship (north-east Poland)
Łosewo, Kolno County in Podlaskie Voivodeship (north-east Poland)